Boulevard is a 1994 Canadian crime thriller film starring Rae Dawn Chong, Kari Wuhrer and Lou Diamond Phillips.

Plot
A woman named Jennifer runs away from her abusive boyfriend, gives her baby up for adoption, and takes the next bus out of town. She ends up on the streets during a grim and cold winter in Toronto. She's taken in by a prostitute named Ola.

Ola happens to see the local pimp Hassan murder another prostitute, but refuses to testify against him, knowing that Hassan has associates that would kill her if she snitched.  A police officer named McClaren attempts to interrogate her, and when she refuses to talk she is deported to the USA.

Ola eventually makes her way back to Toronto, and Jennefer greets her with relief. Feeling bad for not having found a job to help repay Ola's kindness, Jennifer asks for Ola’s help and becomes a prostitute with Ola taking her under her wing to learn the ropes. Jennifer is later confronted by her boyfriend, who has tracked her down with the intent of killing her for leaving him and putting their baby up for adoption behind his back. She eventually breaks free briefly and shoots him in self-defense, then abandoning his body in his car in a local alley.

Meanwhile, Ola, convinced that Hassan had taken Jennefer and was forcing her to work for him and harm her like the rest of his girls, takes her gun and goes over to Hassan's house and demands to know where Jennifer is. Hassan tells her he does not have her, and after a verbal altercation, Ola is beaten violently by Hassan and left to die on the riverbank. Jennifer returns to Ola's apartment looking for her after having killed her boyfriend, but Ola is not there and nobody else seems to know where she is until one of Hassan's girls, Sheila, admits that she saw everything and that Ola is in the hospital near death.

Jennifer rushes to Ola's side where she finds Ola seeming to be comatose. She vows revenge and takes her gun to confront Hassan for what he did to Ola. She shoots him several times and stops short of killing him and leaves the scene. Hassan is then arrested shortly after by McClaren. Jennifer returns to Ola's hospital bedside and tells her she got revenge and that Ola cannot die because she loves her. Suddenly Ola opens her eyes to look at Jennifer, seeming to be awake and Jennifer is hopeful. But then her heart monitor signals that her heartbeat flatlined and she dies. The movie ends with Jennifer packing up some keepsakes of Ola and getting on a bus for some unknown destination.

Cast

Reception
Allmovie critic Sandra Brennan gave the film  stars out of 5.

References

External links
 
 
 

1994 films
1994 crime thriller films
English-language Canadian films
Canadian crime thriller films
1990s English-language films
1990s Canadian films